Stewart Castle was a large sugar plantation in Trelawney Parish, Jamaica. It was established in 1754 by local planter James Stewart.
It was inherited by his son, known as James Stewart II, who mortgaged the estate in 1799.

The estate was 1,230 acres in extent, of which nearly 500 were planted with sugar cane.

References

Fortified houses
Sugar plantations in the Caribbean